

USGS Historical Topographic Maps for the Juneau Icefield area 

The Juneau Icefield is a geological icefield located just north and east of Juneau, Alaska and continues north to the Skagway, Alaska area.
Current research of Climate Change in the field of Glaciology relies upon comparison of historical glacier mass-balance to current conditions. The United States Geological Survey (USGS) historical topographic maps, some more than 65 years old, are useful to a glaciologist in determining glacier change.

These maps were provided by the United States Geological Survey (USGS) and archived to Wikimedia Commons. They are scanned (by the USGS) images of the original paper maps that were published from 1948 to 1997. The information contained in the table below was transcribed from the paper map images displayed in the Image Array.

Notes

See also 
Geospatial Summary of the Research and Recreational facilities within the Juneau Icefield area
Geospatial Summary of the High Peaks/Summits of the Juneau Icefield

References

Sources

Mapping Systems 
USGS Historical Maps(HM)

Boundary Ranges
Ice fields of Alaska
Ice fields of British Columbia
Bodies of ice of Juneau, Alaska
Tongass National Forest